West Depot Glacier is in North Cascades National Park in the U.S. state of Washington, on the north slopes of Mount Redoubt. Melt from the glacier feeds into Depot Creek which flows into Chilliwack Lake. A ridge separates West Depot Glacier from Depot Glacier to the east.

See also
List of glaciers in the United States

References

Glaciers of the North Cascades
Glaciers of Whatcom County, Washington
Glaciers of Washington (state)